Chronic prostatitis may refer to:

 Chronic prostatitis/chronic pelvic pain syndrome (about 90-95% of cases)
 Chronic bacterial prostatitis 
 Asymptomatic inflammatory prostatitis